The Cape Coloured Congress is a South African political party led by Fadiel Adams, the founder of the Gatvol Capetonian Movement. The party was formed in August 2020 and focuses on issues affecting Coloured South Africans in the Western Cape.

The party supports the reintroduction of the death penalty, Cape Independence, the prohibition of comprehensive sex education in schools and social cohesion amongst all minority groups in South Africa.

The party contested the 2021 municipal elections with Adams running as the party's mayoral candidate in the City of Cape Town. The party won seven council seats in Cape Town and one seat in the Saldanha Bay Local Municipality.

Election results

Municipal elections

|-
! Election
! Votes
! %
|-
! 2021
| 54,858
| 0.18%
|-
|}

References

Political parties in South Africa